Festuca brachyphylla, commonly known as alpine fescue or short-leaved fescue, is a grass native to Eurasia, North America, and the Arctic. The grass is used for erosion control and revegetation. The specific epithet brachyphylla means "short-leaved". The grass has a diploid number of 28, 42, or 44.

Description
Festuca brachyphylla is a bright green perennial grass that is tufted or loosely cespitose and erect, growing without rhizomes. The culms are glabrous and somewhat scabrous, becoming more puberulent towards the inflorescence, and are occasionally tinged purple at their base. The smooth or scabrous leaf sheaths are closed for half of their length. The sheaths remain at the basal tuft when dead. The ligules measure . The panicles have one to two erect branches at each node that sometimes become spreading during anthesis. The pedicellate spikelets are purplish or bronze. The spikelets measure , each with two to four florets. The glabrous glumes are ovate to lanceolate and are much shorter than the spikelets. The elliptical or lanceolate lemmas are membranous and become scabrous towards their apex. These short anthers distinguish the species from Festuca ovina.

The spikelets are colored red to purple by anthocyanin pigments.

The plant flowers from late June into July.

Distribution and habitat

Festuca brachyphylla is circumpolar and alpine, occurring in North America throughout Canada and along the Rocky Mountains, growing as far south as New Mexico and California.

It occurs in wet meadows, along streams, on riverbeds, on dry gravel, and on dry slopes.

References

brachyphylla
Plants described in 1827